The Ten-Eyed Man is a fictional character in DC Comics. He first appeared in Batman #226 (Nov. 1970) and was created by Frank Robbins, Irv Novick, and Dick Giordano.

Fictional character biography

Pre-Crisis
Philip Reardon served as a soldier in the U.S. Special Forces during the Vietnam War until he was honorably discharged after a grenade fragment hit him between the eyes. He returned to civilian life as a warehouse security guard. One night, he was knocked out by thieves who planted a bomb to blow up the warehouse. When Batman arrived at the scene, Reardon recovered but his vision was blurred. Mistaking Batman for one of the thieves, Reardon battled him. When he recognized Batman, the warehouse exploded and Reardon's retinas were burned, which impacted his war injury and blinded him permanently in both eyes. A brilliant ophthalmologist named Dr. Engstrom tended to Reardon after being brought to him by the crooks where he reconnected Reardon's optic nerves to the sensory cells in his fingertips. In addition to this, Dr. Engstrom granted Reardon's fingers the gift of sight, enabling him to see through them. He blamed Batman for what had happened and took his revenge on him under the identity of the Ten-Eyed Man. As Batman was also affected by the blast, he used black contact lenses to help him out. As the Ten-Eyed Man attacked Batman, Alfred Pennyworth helped Batman by coordinating instructions to him through the microphone in Batman's mask. Upon finding out that the Ten-Eyed Man can see through his hands, Batman used this to his advantage by using his cape to wrap up the Ten-Eyed Man's hands and then knocked him unconscious. After Batman contacted Dr. Engstrom, the Ten-Eyed Man got away.

Waking up one night in his apartment following a nightmare involving Batman attacking him with a flamethrower, the Ten-Eyed Man finds himself unable to see, thinking that Batman blinded him again, only to remember that he had placed gloves on his hands since his "eyes" do not have eyelids. He then goes to apply for a job as an air marshal, which he passes with his talents and starts making plans to have his revenge on Batman. After hijacking an airplane as a way to lure Batman to Vietnam as part of his revenge, the Ten-Eyed Man led Batman on a cat-and-mouse chase in the jungle using traps that were left after the Vietnam War. He tried to blind Batman with a chemical grenade, but Batman placed the Ten-Eyed Man's hands in a mud pool so that he could subdue him and bring him to justice.

When incarcerated at Gotham State Penitentiary, the Ten-Eyed Man was kept in a jail cell, where the correction officers had his hands locked in a special box that kept him blind all day and night because with eyes on his fingers, "escape would be child's play for him", although precisely how this would be the case was not elaborated upon. Because of his indisputably unique abilities, he was employed by persons unknown as the only villain worthy to attack the Man-Bat. He was even provided a supervillain costume to go with his talents. During this fight, the Man-Bat threw a shrub at him where the Ten-Eyed Man hurt his "eyes" when he caught it. After getting some distance from the Ten-Eyed Man, the Man-Bat caught his breath and figured out who the Ten-Eyed Man is. What he does not know is that the Civil Liberties Association had hired the Ten-Eyed Man to attack him. Upon fighting the Ten-Eyed Man, who was preparing to fire a magnesium flare bomb, the Man-Bat forced the Ten-Eyed Man into dropping the bomb enough to emit a blind light that causes the Ten-Eyed Man to be temporarily blinded and fall off the building.

During the Crisis on Infinite Earths storyline, the Ten-Eyed Man was accidentally killed by Anti-Monitor's shadow demons. It was reportedly at the specific request of Marv Wolfman to put him among a list of characters he wanted to kill first.

His only appearance after that was along with other characters who were wiped out by the Crisis that were recreated by the Psycho-Pirate II.

The New 52
In September 2011, The New 52 rebooted DC's continuity. In this new timeline, the Ten-Eyed Man first appears among the inmates at Arkham Asylum that attack Batwing and Jim Corrigan.

The Ten-Eyed Man is one of the many villains taken down by Batman and Catwoman after he takes her along with him on an average night of his job.

The Ten-Eyed Man later kidnapped a girl named Jade who was under Killer Croc's protection, where he plans to sacrifice her in order to find out the doom that is coming for him. One of his fingers sees Batman, Killer Croc, and Jason Bard above as they leap down towards him upon being discovered. Batman, Jason Bard, and Killer Croc work to stop the Ten-Eyed Man before he can sacrifice Jade so that he can open an inter-dimensional portal. His plot is thwarted by Batman and Jason Bard.

Following Arkham Asylum's destruction, the Gotham City Police Department's headquarters is filled with its inmates. Maggie Sawyer tries to get the answers on what happened there from the inmates, starting with the Ten-Eyed Man. He tells Maggie that he can help her with the answers she needs if she would remove the hand masks from his hands. After being unable to get answers from the Ten-Eyed Man, Maggie Sawyer then attempts to get answers from Maxie Zeus, the Magpie, and the other Arkham Asylum inmates.

Powers and abilities
The Ten-Eyed Man can see through optic nerves in his fingertips, giving him a complete 360 view and limited periscopic vision. His enhanced vision augments his Special Forces training, making him a superb fighter and marksman.

Alternative versions
In issue #30 of DC's year-long miniseries 52, an entirely new take on the Ten-Eyed Man was introduced. The Ten-Eyed Men of the Empty Quarter are a nomadic tribe that inhabit the "Empty Quarter" of an unspecified Middle Eastern desert (though "the Empty Quarter" is the name of a region in Saudi Arabia) and are dedicated to hunting demons. They wear blindfolds and loose-fitting robes with turbans, and have eyes similar to the original Ten-Eyed Man's tattooed on their fingertips. During the issue, Bruce Wayne wanders the desert in search of them, defeats one of their number in hand-to-hand combat, and asks for them to exorcise his personal demons. When Robin catches up to him, Bruce tells him that they have "cut out all the dark, fearful, paranoid urges that I've allowed to corrupt my life" and that "Batman is gone". Whether there is any connection between this tribe and the villainous Ten-Eyed Man is unknown, but is unlikely since the original villain was removed from continuity. An exiled member of this tribe, lacking a finger, is introduced as a terrorist in Batman #675. He kidnaps Jezebel Jet, and is defeated by Bruce Wayne, who was so unstable at that point that he didn't even change to his Batman uniform. Grant Morrison referred to this character as the Nine-Eyed Man.

In other media
The Ten-Eyed Man appears in Batman: The Brave and the Bold, voiced by Robin Atkin Downes. This version possesses eyes on his fingertips.

Bibliography
 Batman #226 (November 1970)
 Batman #231 (May 1971)
 Man-Bat #2 (March 1976)
 Crisis on Infinite Earths #12 (March 1986)
 Who's Who in the DC Universe #23 (January 1987)
 Animal Man #23 (May 1990)
 52 #30 (November 2006)

See also
 List of Batman family enemies

References

External links
 Ten-Eyed Man at DC Appendix

DC Comics supervillains
Fictional Vietnam War veterans
DC Comics metahumans
DC Comics military personnel
Characters created by Frank Robbins
Comics characters introduced in 1970
Suicide Squad members